Luiz Alberto Cardoso de Araújo (born 27 June 1987) is a Brazilian decathlete.

Career
He broke the South American record in decathlon in 30 June 2012, with 8,276 points. In June 2013, Carlos Chinin broke his record, with the mark of 8,393 points.

He competed at the 2012 Summer Olympics, finishing 19th in decathlon with 7,849 points.

In 2015, he won bronze medal at the Pan American Games in Toronto, Ontario, Canada (8,179 points) and he competed at the 2015 World Championships in Beijing, China.

At the 2016 Summer Olympics, he broke 3 personal bests (7.48 in Long Jump, 48.14 in the 400m, and 57.28 m in the Javelin) and finished 10th with 8,315 points, his personal best, and the best campaign of a Brazilian at the Olympic Games in decathlon.

Personal bests
100 m: 10.66 (wind: +1.9 m/s) –  Santo Domingo, 31 May 2008
400 m: 48.14 –  Rio de Janeiro, 17 August 2016
1500 m: 4:27.75 –  São Paulo, 30 June 2012
110 m hurdles: 13.94 (wind: +1.3 m/s) –  São Paulo, 28 June 2008
High jump: 2.00 m –  Toronto, 22 July 2015
Pole vault: 5.00 m –  São Bernardo do Campo, 9 April 2016
Long jump: 7.48 m (wind: -0.2 m/s) –  Rio de Janeiro, 17 August 2016
Shot put: 15.64 m –  São Paulo, 5 August 2011
Discus throw: 48.89 m –  Bragança Paulista, 15 September 2018
Javelin throw: 59.22 m –  Bragança Paulista, 15 September 2018
Decathlon: 8315 pts –  Rio de Janeiro, 17–18 August 2016

Competition record

References

External links

 
 

1987 births
Living people
Brazilian decathletes
Brazilian male hurdlers
Athletes (track and field) at the 2012 Summer Olympics
Athletes (track and field) at the 2016 Summer Olympics
Olympic athletes of Brazil
World Athletics Championships athletes for Brazil
Pan American Games bronze medalists for Brazil
Pan American Games medalists in athletics (track and field)
South American Games gold medalists for Brazil
South American Games silver medalists for Brazil
South American Games medalists in athletics
Athletes (track and field) at the 2015 Pan American Games
Competitors at the 2006 South American Games
Competitors at the 2014 South American Games
Medalists at the 2015 Pan American Games
Sportspeople from São Paulo (state)
21st-century Brazilian people